Hohenwartiana is a genus of air-breathing land snails, terrestrial pulmonate gastropod mollusks in the family Ferussaciidae.

Species
Species within the genus Hohenwartiana include:
 Hohenwartiana aradasiana (Benoit, 1862)
 Hohenwartiana disparata (Westerlund, 1892)
 Hohenwartiana hohenwarti (Rossmässler, 1839)
Species brought into synonymy
 Hohenwartiana buccinula (Grateloup, 1828) †: synonym of Achatina buccinula Grateloup, 1828 † (new combination not accepted; status uncertain)
 Hohenwartiana orghidani Grossu, 1955: synonym of Cecilioides (Cecilioides) veneta (Strobel, 1855) represented as Cecilioides veneta (Strobel, 1855) (junior synonym)

References

 Bank, R. A. (2017). Classification of the Recent terrestrial Gastropoda of the World. Last update: July 16th, 2017.

External links 
  

Ferussaciidae